Human factors in diving equipment design are the influence of the interaction between the diver and the equipment on the design of the equipment. The underwater diver relies on various items of diving and support equipment to stay alive, in reasonable comfort and to perform the planned tasks during a dive. The design of the equipment can strongly influence its effectiveness in performing the desired functions.

Divers vary considerably in anthropometric dimensions, physical strength, joint flexibility, etc. Diving equipment should allow a full range of function as reasonably practicable and should be matched to the diver, the environment and the task. The interface between equipment and diver can strongly influence functionality. Diving support equipment is usually shared by a wide range of divers and must work for them all. Where correct operation and use of equipment is critical to diver safety, it is desirable that different makes and models should work similarly, to facilitate rapid familiarisation with new equipment. Where this is not possible, additional training for the required skills may be necessary.

The most difficult stages of a dive for recreational divers are out of water activities and transitions between water and the surface site such as carrying equipment on shore, exiting from water to boat and shore, surface swimming, and dressing into the equipment. Safety and reliability, adjustability to fit the individual, performance, and simplicity were rated the most important features for diving equipment by recreational divers.

The professional diver is supported by a surface team, who are available to assist with the out-of-water activities to the extent necessary to reduce the risk associated with them to a level acceptable in terms of the governing regulations and codes of practice. This tends to make professional diving more expensive, and the cost tends to be passed onto the client.

General principles 

Diving equipment is used to facilitate underwater activity by the diver. The primary requirements are to keep the diver alive and healthy during the dive. Secondary requirements include providing diver comfort, and sufficient capacity to perform the intended activities. The diver is an integral part of the system, which relies on diver competence as well as correct equipment function for safe operation.

Fault tolerance is the property that enables a system to continue operating properly in the event of the failure of some of its components. If its operating quality decreases at all, the decrease is proportional to the severity of the failure, as compared to a naively designed system, in which even a small failure can cause total breakdown. Fault tolerance is particularly important in high availability or safety-critical systems. The ability to maintain functionality when portions of a system break down is referred to as 'graceful degradation'. Some items of diving equipment, particularly breathing apparatus, buoyancy control equipment, and in some circumstances exposure protection and decompression monitoring equipment, and the diver, may be regarded as safety critical components of the system, and should therefore be tolerant of faults. In the case of the diver, this is achieved by sufficient fitness to dive, competence, and situational awareness. Equipment must be selected which is appropriate for the specific use, and can be designed, manufactured, and maintained to provide appropriate fault tolerance. Good ergonomic design minimises the opportunity for user error.

Breathing apparatus

Breathing apparatus must allow the diver to breathe with minimum added work of breathing, and minimise additional dead space. It should be comfortable to wear, and not cause stress injury or allergic reactions to component materials. It must be reliable and should not require constant attention or adjustment during a dive, and if possible performance should degrade gradually in the event of malfunctions, allowing time for corrective action to be taken with minimum risk. When more than one breathing gas mixture is available, the risk of selecting a gas unsuitable for the current depth must be minimised.

Holding the scuba mouthpiece between the teeth can cause jaw fatigue on a long dive. Jaw loads are a combination of apparent weight, or buoyancy, of the second stage, drag forces due to water or diver movement, hose forces, and inertia due to movement of the head. Smaller second stages and suitable hose routing can reduce some of these loads. Mouthpiece design can affect jaw pain and fatigue by constraining jaw position. Where hose routing is constrained by equipment configuration, a different choice of hose length may help, or a combination of hose length and an angled swivel fitting between the hose and demand valve. Customised bite grips can also reduce jaw fatigue.

Allergic reactions to materials in contact with lips, gums and tongue are less common with silicone rubber and other hypoallergenic mouthpieces than with natural rubber, which was commonly used in older equipment.

Some divers experience a gag reflex with mouthpieces that contact the roof of the mouth, (DAN Europe surveys), but this can be corrected by fitting a different style mouthpiece.

Purging the second stage is a useful function to clear water from the interior. The purge button should function only when pressed, sufficiently to clear the chamber without blowing its contents down the diver's throat. There is a risk of regulator freeze when purging in cold water. Purge flow rate should not be unnecessarily high.

Cracking pressure is the pressure difference over the diaphragm needed to open the second stage valve. This should be low but not excessively sensitive to water movement. Once open, with gas flowing, the gas flow often produces a slight increase in the pressure drop in the demand valve which helps hold it open during inhalation, effectively reducing the work of breathing, but making the regulator more susceptible to free-flow. This can be adjusted by user-operated sensitivity settings in high-performance models.

The exhaust valve should offer the minimum resistance to exhalation, including a minimum opening pressure difference, and low resistance to flow through the opening. It should not easily block or leak due to foreign matter such as vomit. Exhaust gas flow should not be unduly distracting or annoying to the diver in normal diving posture. Flow should be directed away from the faceplate of the mask, which is a combined effect of DV and mask design. Bubbles are noisy, and flow directly over the ears is undesirable, though a neoprene hood can help muffle the noise.

Breathing effort should be reasonable in all diver attitudes. The diver can rotate in three axes, and may need to do so for a significant period including several breaths from any arbitrary orientation. The DV should continue to function correctly throughout the maneuvers, though some variation in breathing effort is inevitable. Manual adjustment of the inhalation valve spring may be available, and can help if an unusual orientation must be maintained for a long period.

Handedness of the regulator, hose length, and hose routing can effect the ergonomics of providing emergency gas to another diver. Several configurations have been used, each having advantages and disadvantages depending on the situation. Techniques also vary depending on the configuration, and each requires learning and practice for adequate performance under stress.

Rebreathers
 
Rebreather equipment removes carbon dioxide from exhaled gas and replaces the oxygen, then lets the diver breathe the gas again. This can be done in a self-contained system carried by the diver, in a system where the scrubber is carried by the diver and gas is supplied from the surface, or where the gas is returned to the surface for recycling, and the power to circulate gas in the loop can be the lung power of the diver, energy from the supply gas pressure, or externally powered booster pumps. Scuba rebreathers tend to circulate the gas in the breathing loop by lung power, and the work of breathing can be a significant part of diver effort at depth, in extreme circumstances it may exceed the capacity of the diver.

The widest variety of rebreather types is used in diving, as the physical and physiological consequences of breathing under pressure complicate the requirements, and a large range of engineering options are available depending on the specific application and available budget. A diving rebreather is safety-critical life-support equipment – some modes of failure can kill the diver without warning, others can require immediate appropriate response for survival.

General operational requirements include:
waterproof and corrosion resistant construction
reasonably close to neutrally buoyant and balanced after ballasting
acceptably streamlined, to minimize added swimming resistance
low work of breathing in all diver attitudes and over the full operating depth range
the unit should not adversely affect the diver's trim and balance
easy and quick release of harness and unaided removal of the unit from the diver
accessibility of control and adjustment components
unambiguous feedback to the diver of critical information
no critical single-point failure modes – The user should be able to deal with any single reasonably foreseeable failure without outside help

Special applications may also require:
low noise signal
low emission of bubbles/small bubbles
low electromagnetic signature
rugged construction
light weight in air
minimal additional task-loading for normal operation

Rebreathers can vary considerably in setup and operation, and type training is considered essential for safe operation by the training agencies and manufacturers.

Diving suits

Diving suits are worn for protection from the environment. In most cases this is to keep the diver warm, as heat loss to water is rapid. There is a trade-off between insulation, comfort, and mobility. When diving in the presence of hazardous materials, the diving suit also serves as personal protective equipment to limit exposure to those materials.

Wetsuits 

 
Wetsuits rely on a good fit to work effectively. The insulation relies on the low heat conductivity of the gas bubbles in the neoprene foam of the suit slowing heat loss from the water inside the suit to the water outside. If the water inside the suit can be flushed out and replaced by cold water, this insulating function is bypassed. Movement of the diver tends to move the water in the suit around mostly where it is present in thick layers, and if this water is forced out it will be replaced by cold water from outside. A close fit reduces the thickness of the layer of water and makes it more resistant to flushing. Semi-dry suits attempt to address this issue by making it more difficult for water to enter and leave the suit. They are also most effective when close fitting. A different problem can be caused by a suit that is too tight. If it restricts breathing this can aggravate work of breathing issues due to depth and gas density, which may not be noticeable at the surface, but can become a serious problem at depth. The insulation of foamed neoprene is mostly in the gas bubbles, which are compressed by the ambient pressure, so the insulation reduces with depth. Heavier duty neoprene compresses less but is less flexible, so it may be a better insulator, but may also encumber the diver more. A number of inner surface finishes, from bare rubber to plush have been tried. Each has advantages some of the time. Wetsuits are sufficiently similar that once the buoyancy characteristics of a different suit have been compensated by correct ballasting and a suitable buoyancy compensator selected, very little familiarisation is needed, and retraining is unnecessary.

Dry suits 

Dry suits rely on staying dry inside and maintaining a limited volume of gas distributed through the thermal undergarments. The volume of gas needed is fairly constant, but it expands and contracts in response to the ambient pressure variations as the diver changes depth. Squeeze and overinflation are dangerous. Suit squeeze is caused by insufficient gas in the suit, and will reduce flexibility of the suit and restrict the diver's freedom of motion. This could prevent the diver from reaching critical equipment in an emergency. Gas is added manually by pressing a button to open the inflation valve, which is customarily sited in the central chest area where it can easily be reached by both hands and is clear of the harness and buoyancy compensator. High flow rates are neither necessary nor desirable, as they could lead to overinflation, particularly if the valve sticks open due to freeze. Overinflation will cause an uncontrollable rapid ascent if not corrected. Dumping of suit gas is only possible in a restricted range of orientations, where the dump valve is above the gas to be dumped. During ascent, the diver has several things to monitor and do. so an adjustable automatic exhaust valve which provides hands-free operation helps reduce this task loading.

Problems caused by flooding of dry suits:
Loss of thermal insulation and body chilling will generally make it necessary to abort the dive, but an immediate ascent may not be possible, or safe. 
Loss of buoyancy can be mitigated by deploying a DSMB, use of a large volume buoyancy compensator, or small lifting bag, or ditching ballast weight. It depends on details of the leak whether the suit will retain any gas, and where such gas can be held. 
The added mass and bulk of water in the suit will make exit from the water difficult. Mitigation is possible by fitting ankle dumps or cutting the suit at each ankle to allow the water to drain.

The ability of the diver to reach the cylinder valve can be constrained by the suit and personal joint flexibility of the diver. Back-mount configurations with valves up are difficult for many divers to reach to open or close the valves. This can cause delays in reacting effectively to some emergencies. This is partly a suit issue and partly a cylinder configuration issue.

The combination of suit and helmet can constrain movement more than either on its own. Dive suits can produce physiological strain in the user and considerable effort may be necessary to overcome the encumbrance of the suit. This can result in longer periods required to complete complex tasks, in an environment that is already non-conducive to dexterity or heavy labour. This was particularly noticeable on the standard diving suit.

Wrist and neck seals are commonly available in latex rubber, silicone rubber and expanded neoprene. Some divers are allergic to latex, and should avoid latex seals.

Dry suits can be effective for protection against exposure to a wide range of hazardous materials, and the choice of suit material should take into account its resistance to the known contaminants. Hazmat diving often requires complete isolation of the diver from the environment, necessitating the use of dry glove systems and helmets sealed directly to the suit.

The operation and skill requirements for the safe use of dry suits has become fairly standardised, so that although initial training is considered essential, switching between makes and models does not usually require retraining, and familiarisation is rapid.

Hot water suits 
 
Hot water suits are usually made in one piece of foamed neoprene with a zipper on the front of the torso and on the lower part of each leg, and are similar to wetsuits in construction and appearance, but they do not fit as closely by design, and need not be very thick, as their primary function is to temporarily retain and guide the flow of the heating water. The wrists and ankles of the suit must allow water to flush out of the suit as it is replenished with fresh hot water from the surface. Gloves and boots are worn which receive hot water from the ends of the arm and leg hoses. If a full-face mask is worn, the hood may be supplied by a tube at the neck of the suit. Helmets do not require heating. Breathing gas can be heated at the helmet by using a hot water shroud over the helmet inlet piping between the valve block and the regulator, which reduces heat loss to the breathing gas.

Hot water suits are often used for deep dives when breathing mixes containing helium are used. Helium conducts heat much more efficiently than air, which means that the diver will lose large amounts of body heat through the lungs when breathing it. This compounds the risk of hypothermia already present in the cold temperatures found at these depths. Under these conditions, a hot water suit is a matter of survival, not comfort. Loss of heated water supply for hot water suits can be a life-threatening emergency with a high risk of debilitating hypothermia. Just as an emergency backup source of breathing gas is required, a backup water heater is also an essential precaution whenever dive conditions warrant a hot water suit. If the heater fails and a backup unit cannot be immediately brought online, a diver in the coldest conditions can die within minutes. Depending on decompression obligations, bringing the diver directly to the surface could prove equally deadly.

Heated water in the suit forms an active insulation barrier to heat loss, but the temperature must be regulated within fairly close limits. If the temperature falls below about 32 °C, hypothermia can result, and temperatures above 45 °C can cause burn injury to the diver. The diver may not notice a gradual change in inlet temperature, and in the early stages of hypo- or hyperthermia, may not notice the deteriorating condition. The suit must be loose fitting to allow unimpeded water flow, but this causes a large transient volume of water (13 to 22 litres) to be held in the suit, which can impede swimming due to the added Inertia in the legs.

The diver will usually wear something under a hot water suit for protection against scalding, chafe and for personal hygiene, as hot water suits may be shared by divers on different shifts, and the interior of the suit may transmit fungal infections if not sufficiently cleaned between users. Wetsuits are effective against scalding of the covered parts of the body, and thermal underwear can protect against chafe, and keep the standby diver warm at the surface before the dive.

The hot water supply hose of the umbilical is connected to a supply manifold at the right hip of the suit, which has a set of valves to allow the diver to control flow to the front and back of the torso, and to the arms and legs, and to dump the supply to the environment if the water is too hot or too cold. The manifold distributes the water through the suit through perforated tubes.

Some initial training in the safe and effective use of hot water suits is considered necessary, but the skills are quickly learned and easily transferable between makes.

Atmospheric suits 

The physiological problems of ambient pressure diving are largely eliminated by isolating the diver from the water and hydrostatic pressure in an atmospheric suit.

Dexterity problems with manipulators on atmospheric diving suits reduce their effectiveness for many tasks. The joints of atmospheric suits allow walking but are not suitable for swimming.

The interior of the suit must maintain constant volume during articulation, as a variable volume would require additional effort to move from a lower volume geometry to higher volume due to the large pressure difference.

A range of user sizes can be accommodated by providing spacers between components, but the extra joints are potential leaks. Mix and match alternative limbs that require moving seals to be split and reconnected may need to be pressure tested before use.

The work required to overcome friction in the pressure-resistant joint seals, inertia of the limb armour, and hydrodynamic drag of the bulky limbs moving through the water are major constraints on agility and the modes of locomotion available, though buoyancy control is relatively simple, as the suit is relatively incompressible, and the life support system is closed so there is no weight change due to gas consumption.

Although the pressure hull of the suit is often made from metals with high heat conductivity, insulating the diver is largely a matter of wearing clothing suitable for the internal air temperature, and insulating the shell away from the moving parts of joints is fairly straightforward. The air is recycled through the scrubber, which will heat it slightly through the exothermic chemical reaction which removes carbon dioxide.

The helmet is rigidly connected to the torso of the suit, which limits the field of vision. this can be partly compensated by using a nearly hemispherical dome viewport.

Atmospheric diving suits are still an emerging technology, and differ considerably, so specialist training is required for each model.

Harness

The surface-supplied diver's harness is an item of strong webbing, and sometimes cloth, which is fastened around a diver over the exposure suit, and allows the diver to be lifted without risk of falling out of the harness. It also provides support for the bailout gas cylinder, and may carry the ballast weights, a buoyancy compensator, the cutting tool, and other equipment. Several types are in use. Recreational scuba harness is mainly used to support the gas cylinders, buoyancy compensator and often the weights and small accessories, but is not normally required to function as a lifting harness. These functions require distribution of the loads to the diver securely and comfortably.

Load distribution of weight carried by the harness can cause discomfort and nerve pressure injury out of the water, and the weight of the harness including cylinders can be problematic for putting the set on for some divers.

A harness that must support side-mounted cylinders should not unduly encumber the diver or make it difficult to access critical equipment like buckles, weights, cylinder valves, demand valves and pressure gauges. More than one cylinder may be mounted at each side.

In professional diving the harness must also function as a lifting harness, and must be strong enough to support the diver and attached equipment if lifted by the lifeline or umbilical, without causing direct or indirect injury. Some discomfort is considered acceptable as this is an emergency procedure.

Buoyancy control equipment

Buoyancy control by adjustable volume of gas in an environment where pressure varies rapidly with depth is inherently unstable and requires continuous monitoring and control input from the diver. The instability is proportional to the volume of the gas required for neutral buoyancy.

For the least sensitivity to depth variation, the volume of gas required for neutral buoyancy should be kept to a minimum averaged over the dive. This implies ballasting that is just sufficient to allow neutral buoyancy at the minimum weight of diver and equipment that is reasonably likely to occur during the dive. The obvious case is where a delay pushes the diver further into decompression obligation than planned, and it may be necessary to decompress at a shallow stop with the last remaining gas. This is not a time to be struggling to stay down, using more gas than otherwise necessary with the effort. The weight change in most dives is due to gas use, and unless equipment is lost or abandoned, the maximum weight change is the consumption of all the gas in all the cylinders carried. This can be calculated easily. The diver needs enough buoyancy volume to remain comfortably afloat before the dive starts. At the end of the dive there will be more buoyancy in reserve as a result of the gas consumption. Any large amount of reserve volume in the buoyancy compensator has potential for contributing to an uncontrolled buoyant ascent.

Gas in the dry suit is primarily intended for thermal insulation. The additional buoyancy is a normally undesirable but unavoidable side effect. When there is sufficient gas to relieve compression of the under-suit, any excess will gather at a local high point and contributes little to insulation. Removal of excess gas from the suit is only possible when the path of the excess gas to the dump valve or other vent point is upward. Automatic dump valve position is conventionally on the upper left sleeve, clear of the harness, but in easy reach of the diver at all times and at a natural high point for the most useful and likely trim positions for swimming, work, and particularly ascents. Other less popular options are on the forearm or cuff dumps, and most cuff seals will vent if raised high enough unless dry gloves are worn. Any upward excursion by the diver will cause the gas in the suit to expand in proportion to the pressure change. Diver trim which guarantees easy venting of the suit during a normal, head-up ascent is inefficient for horizontal propulsion. The diver in a position trimmed with feet high is at risk of losing control of buoyancy in the event of a significant upward excursion. This can be mitigated by ankle dump valves, but they are not fitted as standard equipment and are not used by most divers. Finning downwards against the buoyancy of excess gas trapped in the legs of a dry suit is energetic at best and futile at worst. The problem can be exacerbated if the legs are baggy at the ankles and the boots are loose, as if they slip off the feet all control of, and transfer of power to the fins is lost. Gaiters and ankle straps can reduce the volume of this part of a suit, and may also reduce hydrodynamic drag, while ankle weights require acceleration with every fin stroke.

The dry suit should not unduly restrict the diver's freedom of movement, but should not be excessively baggy, which can trap gas in unwanted places, and can increase drag as well as causing buoyancy and trim problems. The inherently baggy rubberised canvas standard diving dress was available with lace-up legs to manage this problem. This option is no longer available, and divers must have suits tailored for a good fit.

Female divers are reported to have more difficulties with buoyancy and trim. This may be a consequence of a buoyancy distribution not well catered for by most harness, buoyancy compensator and weighting systems, possibly exacerbated by dry suit buoyancy distribution. Many manage with available equipment, but it may take longer to learn to use less ergonomically matched equipment effectively. A similar problem is reported with unusually small divers.

The operating skills for most types of single bladder buoyancy compensator are standardised and portable between models. Familiarisation is rapid and straightforward, and retraining is generally not required, though additional training is provided for adapting to sidemount because of the associated changes in breathing apparatus management. Twin bladder units require more adaptation of procedures, and are associated with more accidents due to human error, as there are more kinds of operator errors that can be made.

Weights

Weighting systems are needed to compensate for the buoyancy of the diver and buoyant equipment, mainly thermally insulating diving suits. The load distribution of buoyancy and ballast affect diver trim, which influences propulsion efficiency, and through that, breathing gas consumption.

Weight-belts of conventional design are fastened around the waist and load the lower back when the diver is trimmed horizontal. This can cause lower back pain, particularly when heavy to compensate for the buoyancy of a dry suit with thick undergarments. Weights supported by the harness distribute the load more evenly.

Ankle weights used to improve trim add inertia to the feet, which must be accelerated and decelerated with every fin stroke, requiring additional power input for finning and reducing propulsive efficiency.

The facility to shed ballast weight is considered a safety feature for scuba diving as it allows the diver to achieve a positive level of buoyancy in an emergency, but inadvertent loss of ballast when the diver needs to control ascent rate is itself an emergency that can cause decompression illness.
 
The need to pull weights clear of other equipment when ditching in some orientations is additional task loading in an emergency. Getting the weight belt caught up in the harness can compound the diver's problems if the need to establish positive buoyancy is urgent.

Ditching all weights may be appropriate for some emergencies, but in others it just changes the nature of the emergency.

Fins

Fin design is a compromise between propulsive efficiency and maneuverability. Monofins are the equipment of choice for deep apnea diving and both speed and endurance competition. Breath hold spearfishers need more maneuverability while retaining the best reasonably practicable efficiency, and they mostly choose long bifins. Professional and recreational scuba and surface-supplied divers will sacrifice more efficiency for better maneuverability. Comfort issues, stressing of muscles and joints, particularly with less physically fit divers, may bias the choice towards softer fins that produce less thrust and maneuverability. Divers needing maximum maneuverability will usually choose stiff paddle fins which can be effective for reversing out of a tight spot but are inefficient for cruising using flutter kick. These fins work well with the frog kick, which is also less likely to shed vortices downward and disturb silty bottoms, so this style of fin is popular for cave and wreck penetration diving.

Experimental work suggests that larger fin blades are more efficient in converting diver effort to thrust, and are more economical in breathing gas for similar propulsive effect. Larger fins were perceived to be less fatiguing than smaller fins. For each kick stroke the mass of the fin must be accelerated once in each direction, so getting more thrust per stroke will waste less work on fin and leg accelerations. This effect also relates to heavier fins, boots and ankle weights.

Attachment to the foot follows two basic options. An integral foot pocket enclosing the heel, or an open heeled foot pocket with an elastic heel strap, which may be of adjustable length. Both systems allow full mobility of the ankle joint for bi-fins, but limit the motion for monofins.

Full foot-pockets are softer and more comfortable on bare feet, and spread the loads more evenly, but are often unsuited to wearing over a thick or hard-soled boot suitable for crossing rough rocky shores. Fin retainers may be necessary for security if the fit is a bit loose. Open heel foot pockets can be matched with foot width when wearing a boot, and the heel-strap selected or adjusted to fit. Fin straps may be of fixed or adjustable length. Fixed length straps are always the right length for a single user, and have fewer snag points, moving parts and other things that can fail. Adjustable straps are quickly adaptable to the feet of different users, a major advantage for rental equipment.

Masks and helmets

 
Diving masks and helmets have some common functions: both provide an air space between the eyes a and a transparent window to allow the diver a clear view underwater. Other functions may differ or partly overlap.

Seal 
The mask must form a watertight seal around the edges to keep water out of the mask, regardless of the attitude of the diver in the water. This seal is between the elastomer skirt of the mask and the skin of the face. Fit of mask affects the seal and comfort and must account for variability of face shapes and sizes. This is achieved for half masks by the very wide range of models available, but in spite of this some faces are too narrow, or noses too large to fit comfortably. This is less of a problem with full-face masks and less again with helmets, but other problems affect these, like overall head size, and neck length and circumference, so there is still a need for adjustment and a few size options.

Face and neck seals may be compromised by hair passing under the seal between the rubber and skin, and the amount of leakage will depend on the amount of hair and the position of the compromised part of the seal. Divers with large amounts of facial hair can usually compensate adequately on open circuit, but may use more gas than otherwise necessary with a rebreather due to leakage and more frequent need to clear water from the mask.

Equalising 
Two aspects of equalising the pressure in gas spaces are influenced by mask and helmet design. These are equalising the internal space of the mask or helmet itself, and equalising the ears. Equalising the internal space of a half mask is normally achieved through the nose, and equalising the ears requires a method to block the nostrils. This is relatively easy to do with half-masks, where the diver can usually pinch the nostrils closed through the rubber of the mask skirt.

Helmets and most full-face masks do not allow the diver finger access to the nose, and various mechanical aids have been tried with varying levels of comfort and convenience.

Vision 
The field of vision of the diver is reduced by opaque parts of the helmet or mask. Peripheral vision is particularly reduced in the lower areas due to the bulk of the demand valve. Helmet design is a compromise between low mass and inertia, with relatively small interior volume and viewports affording restricted field of vision, and large viewports with large interior volume. Siting the viewport close to the eyes helps provide a better view but is complicated by the need for sufficient clearance in front of the nose for a wide range of divers. Curved viewports can introduce visual distortions that can reduce the effectiveness of the diver at judging distance, and almost all viewports are made flat. Even a flat viewport causes some distortion, but it takes relatively little time to get used to this, as it is always the same. Spherical port surfaces are generally used in recent atmospheric suits for structural reasons, and work well when the interior volume is large enough. They can be made wide enough for adequate peripheral vision. Field of vision in helmets is affected by mobility of the helmet. A helmet directly supported by the head can rotate with the head, allowing the diver to aim the viewport at the target, but peripheral vision is constrained by the dimensions of the viewport, the weight in air and unbalanced buoyancy forces when immersed must be carried by the neck, and inertial and hydrodynamic loads must be carried by the neck. A helmet fixed to a breastplate is supported by the torso, which can safely support much greater loads, but does not rotate with the head. The entire upper body must rotate to direct the field of vision. This makes it necessary to use larger viewports so the diver has an acceptable field of vision at times when rotating the body is impractical. The need to rotate the head inside the non-rotatable helmet requires internal clearance, therefore a large volume, and consequently a greater mass of ballast.

Divers who need optical correction have choices. Contact lenses can be worn under all types of masks and helmets. Regular spectacles can be worn in most helmets, but can not be adjusted during the dive. Corrective lenses can be glued to the inside of half-masks and some full-face masks, but the distance from the eyes to the lenses may not be optimal. Bifocal arrangements are available, mostly for far-sightedness, and are popular with older divers to allow them to read their instruments. Defogging of bonded lenses is the same as for plain glass. Some dive computers have relatively large font displays, and adjustable brightness to suit the ambient lighting.

Open circuit breathing apparatus produces exhalation gas bubbles at the exhaust ports. Free-flow systems produce the largest volumes, but the outlet can be behind the viewports so it does not obscure the diver's vision. Demand systems must have the second stage diaphragm and exhaust ports at approximately the same depth as the mouth or lungs to minimise work of breathing. To get consistent breathing effort for the range of postures the diver may need to assume, this is most practicable when the exhaust ports and valves are close to the mouth, so some form of ducting is required to direct the bubbles away from the viewports of helmet or mask. This generally diverts exhaust gases round the sides of the head, where they tend to be rather noisy as the bubbles rise past the ears. Closed circuit systems vent far less gas, which can be released behind the diver, and are significantly quieter. Diffuser systems have been tried, but have not been successful for open circuit equipment, though they have been used on rebreathers, where they improve stealth characteristics.

The inside surface of the viewport of a mask or helmet tends to be prone to fogging, where tiny droplets of condensed water disperse light passing through the transparent material, blurring the view. Treating the inside surface with a defogging surfactant before the dive can reduce fogging, but it may occur anyway, and it must be possible to actively defog, either by rinsing with water or by blowing dry air over it until it is clear. There is no supply of dry air to a half-mask, but rinsing is easy and need only momentarily interrupt breathing. A spitcock may be provided on standard helmets for rinsing. Demand helmets generally have a free-flow supply valve which directs dry air over the inside of the faceplate. Full-face masks may use either rinsing or free-flow, depending on whether they are intended primarily for scuba or surface-supply.

Security 
Masks held in place by adjustable straps can be knocked off or moved from the correct position, allowing water to flood in. Half masks are more susceptible, but as the diver can still breathe with a flooded half mask this is not considered a major issue. Full-face masks are part of the breathing passage, and need to be more securely supported, usually by 4 or 5 adjustable straps, connected at the back of the head, but it is possible for them to be dislodged, so it must be possible for the diver to refit them sufficiently to continue breathing. Helmets are much more securely attached, and it is considered an emergency if they come off the head, as it is difficult for the diver to rectify the problem underwater, though it is usually still possible to breathe carefully if the free-flow valve is opened.

Internal volume 
The volume of dead space is important for full-face masks and helmets, but not relevant to half masks as they are not part of the breathing passage.

Large internal volume half-masks tend to float up against the nose, which is uncomfortable, and becomes painful over time. The trend is towards low volumes and wide fields of vision, which requires the viewport to be close to the face. This makes it difficult to design a frame and nose pocket that will accommodate the full range of face shapes and sizes. Wide and high-bridged noses and very narrow faces are a particular problem, but the range of masks available will provide for most people. The clearance between viewport and eye should allow for the eyelashes when blinking.

Full-face masks have larger internal volume, but they are strapped on more securely and the load is carried by the neck. This load is small enough to be easily accommodated by most divers, though it may take some time to get used to it.

Helmet buoyancy 
The weight of a lightweight demand helmet in air is about 15 kg. Underwater it is nearly neutrally buoyant so it is not an excessive static load on the neck. The helmet is a close fit to the head and moves with the head, allowing the diver to aim the viewport using head movement to compensate for the restricted field of vision.

Free-flow helmets compensate for a potentially large dead space by a high gas flow rate, so that exhaled gas is flushed away before it can be rebreathed. They tend to have a large internal volume, and be heavier than demand helmets, and usually rest on the shoulders, so do not move with the head. As there is no need for an oro-nasal inner mask, they usually have a large viewport or several viewports to compensate for the fixed position. The diver can move the head inside the helmet to a limited extent, but to look around further, the diver must rotate the torso. The view downwards is particularly restricted, and requires the diver to bend over to see the area near the feet.

Gloves
 

Glove fit is important for several reasons. Gloves that are too tight restrict movement and require more effort to grip, which causes early fatigue. Reduced blood flow may cause cramping. loose gloves may be ineffective against heat loss due to flushing, and may reduce dexterity due to excess bulk.

There is a conflict between insulation and dexterity, and the reduction of tactile sense, grip strength, and early fatigue due to thick gloves or chilled hands. The diver can tolerate greater heat loss through the hands if the rest of the diver is warm, but in some cases such as diving in near-freezing water or where the air temperature at the surface is below freezing, the risk of frostbite or non-freezing cold injury necessitates the use of gloves most of the time. Suitable design of equipment can help make the work of correct operation easier. For safety-critical equipment, dexterity can make the difference between managing a problem adequately, or a situation deteriorating beyond recovery. Simple, large control interfaces such as oversize knobs and buttons, large clips, and tools that can be gripped by a heavily gloved hand can reduce risk significantly.

In very cold water there are two problems causing loss of dexterity. The chilling of hands and fingers directly causes loss of feeling and strength of the hands, and thick gloves needed to reduce chilling also reduce the sensitivity of the fingertips, making it more difficult to feel what the fingers are doing. Thick gloves also make the fingertips wider and thicker and a poorer fit to components designed to be used by the naked hands. This is less of a problem with gloves where the fingertips have a reduced thickness of cover over the contact surface, but few neoprene gloves have this feature. The fingertips of the thumbs and forefingers are most affected, and also wear out faster than the rest of the glove. Some divers wear a thinner, tougher, work glove under the neoprene insulating glove, and cut the tips off the thumbs and forefingers of the neoprene gloves to expose the inner gloves as a workable compromise. Dry gloves allow the diver to tailor the inner insulating glove to suit the task. Insulation can be thicker where it affects dexterity least, and thinner where more sensitivity is needed.

Long term grip strength is reduced by fatigue. If the glove requires effort to close the hand to hold an object, this will eventually tire the muscles involved, and grip will weaken sooner than when affected by cold alone. This is mitigated by gloves with a preform to fit a partly closed hand, and by more flexible glove materials. With dry gloves, the inner glove can be tailored to be thicker where the insulation will not interfere with grip effort, while the outer, watertight glove can be chosen to provide the necessary toughness and wear resistance.

Cylinder configurations

 
When using multiple gas sources with multiple gas mixtures it can be critically important to avoid confusion of gas mix in use and pressure remaining in the various cylinders. The cylinder arrangement must allow access to cylinder valves when in the water. Use of the wrong gas for the depth can have fatal consequences without warning. High task loading for technical divers can distract from checking the mix when switching gas. It is important to check that each cylinder is what it should be and is mounted in the right place, to positively identify the new gas at each gas switch, and to adjust the decompression computer to allow for each change in gas for correct decompression. Some computers automatically change based on data from integrated pressure transducers, but still require correct pre-dive setting of gas mixes.

Classical configurations: 
Back-mounted single cylinder is stable on the diver in and out of the water, compact and acceptably balanced. Some divers have difficulty reaching the valve knob, which is behind the back, particularly when the cylinder is mounted relatively low on the harness, or the suit is thick or tight. 
Back-mounted twins with isolation manifold are stable in and out of the water, compact, heavy, and acceptably balanced for most divers. Some divers have difficulty reaching the valve knobs behind the back. This can be a problem in a free-flow or leak emergency, where much gas can be lost due to inability to access knobs quickly to shut down. Weight and buoyancy distribution may be top heavy for some divers. 
Back-mounted independent doubles. Gas is not available if a cylinder valve must be shut down.
Flexible valve knob extensions on back mount sets are not very satisfactory and not very reliable, and are an additional snag risk. 
Pony cylinders for bailout or decompression gas clamped to the main gas supply put the valve where it cannot be seen, and may be difficult to reach. They are reasonably compact and manageable out of the water. 
Sling mount bailout and decompression cylinders allow easy access to the valve and visual check of labels on during gas switching. Up to four sling cylinders are reasonably manageable with some practice. 
Alternative configurations: 
Inverted single or manifolded twin cylinders with valves at the bottom which are more reachable, but more vulnerable to impact damage. Custom hose lengths are needed, and hose routing will be different. This arrangement works for firefighters, and has been used by military divers. Weight and buoyancy distribution may be bottom heavy for some divers, and may adversely affect trim. This arrangement is also used for the gas cylinders on some models of rebreather. 
Side mount provides much easier valve access, and it is possible to see the top of each cylinder to check the label when switching gas, which allows confirmation of correct gas. It is possible to hand off a cylinder when donating gas to another diver, so a long hose is not needed. The configuration has a lower profile than back mount, and it is possible to unclip cylinders for access of small openings. The configuration is clumsy out of water for crossing uneven terrain, and it can be difficult to mount more than one large cylinder each side when kitting up. Carrying six cylinders is probably more difficult when all are side-mounted than when two are back mounted. Lateral shift of centre of gravity as gas is consumed is noticeable. Buoyancy distribution of cylinders is top heavy due to the regulator and valve. Buoyancy changes when handing off or staging must be compensated, but this applies to all configurations. Buoyancy changes due to gas consumption can cause cylinders to hang awkwardly if the bottom ends start to float. Stuffing hoses under bungees on the cylinder can be awkward when the hands are full of other equipment like camera and reel, but necessary to avoid dangling regulators snagging on the environment. Adding buoyancy to the top of a cylinder to improve cylinder trim makes it necessary for the diver to carry extra weight.

Bailout sets for surface-supplied diving are usually back mounted to keep the driver's arms and front clear for working. The position of the cylinder valve behind the shoulders where it does not interfere with head movement can be difficult to impossible for a helmeted diver to reach, particularly in an emergency. Therefore, the cylinder valve is conventionally opened fully before the dive and the bailout valve at the helmet closed. In diver jargon this is reported as "on at the tap, off at the hat" during pre-dive checks. An alternative arrangement which allows the diver easier access to the cylinder valve, is to wear the bailout cylinder inverted, with the cylinder valve in the small of the back where it is relatively easy to reach. This configuration requires a longer than standard second stage hose feeding intermediate pressure gas to the bailout block, but these are generally available off the shelf. The inverted arrangement may put the cylinder valve and regulator first stage at more risk of impact damage when the diver is out of the water, and when dressing the diver.

Training specific to basic open circuit cylinder configuration is considered desirable, as the skills required are safety-critical, and vary significantly between the standard single back-mount, twin back-mount, back-mount with stage or bailout cylinders, and side-mount.

Surface-supplied gas supply manifolds 

Breathing gas supplied to divers from the surface is routed through a surface control manifold, the gas panel, and may also pass through a manifold in an open or closed diving bell. The surface gas panel may be operated by the diving supervisor or a designated gas man, and the bell panel is the responsibility of the bellman. The gas panels are arranged so that it is clear to the operator which valves and gauges serve each diver. The surface standby diver may be supplied from an independent panel with independent gas supplies, so the standby diver is isolated from gas supply problems that may affect the working divers.

Considerations for gas panel design include:
 Providing the right supply pressure for the depth for each diver, which requires monitoring the depth of each diver, which is done using the pneumofathometer gauge for that diver. 
 Control of flow rate for free-flow helmets, usually by setting a specific supply gas overpressure relative to diver ambient pressure. 
 Monitoring the supply pressure of connected gases: each gas supply connected to the manifold must be positively identified. 
 When changing between main and secondary gas supply, it must be clear which supply is in use. 
 Identification of the breathing gas in use: the critical factor is that the gas must be breathable at the current depth, which is a function of oxygen partial pressure. When gases with different oxygen content are connected to a panel, it is prudent, and may be required, to continuously monitor the oxygen content in the diver's supply hose. 
 Identification of the part of the system supplying each diver when more than one is on the panel, 
 Gas switching for depth and decompression. This involves changing the oxygen content of the gas supplied to the diver. Since decompression time depends on the breathing gas, positive identification of the current mixture is necessary. 
Safe and reliable gas provision to the divers depends on the panel operator having a clear and accurate knowledge of the status of the valves and pressures at the panel. This is helped by arranging the components of the panel so that it is immediately obvious which components are dedicated to each diver, what the function of each component is, and the status of each valve. Quarter turn ball valves are generally used because it is immediately obvious from the handle position whether they are open or closed. The spatial arrangement of valves and gauges on the panel is usually either the same for each diver, or mirrored. all operable valves and gauges should be labeled, and colour or shape coding may be useful.

Pneumofathomer gas supply does not have to be the same as main breathing gas supply, but as it is an emergency breathing gas supply, it must be safe to breathe at the current depth, even if not optimal, It is much simpler just to use the same gas supply, as usage is relatively low, and this eliminates a possible source of high consequence error.

Instrumentation and displays 

Diving instrumentation may be for safety or to facilitate the task. The safety-critical information such as gas pressure and decompression status should be presented clearly and unambiguously.

Lack of standardised dive computer user-interfaces can cause confusion under stress. Computer lock-out at times of great need is a potentially fatal design flaw. The meaning of alarms and warnings should be immediately obvious. The diver should be dealing with the problem, not trying to work out what it is. Displays should allow for variations in visual acuity, and be readable with colour-blindness. Ideally, critical displays should be readable without a mask, or provide for safe surfacing without a mask. There should not be too much distracting information on the main screen, and return to the main screen should be automatic by default, or auxiliary screens should continue to display critical decompression data. Dive computers are safety critical equipment, but there is very little formal training provided for their use, and models vary considerably in operation, and are often not intuitive, so skills are not transferable when a new unit is used. The user manual is usually all that is available to learn from, and it cannot be taken underwater for convenient reference. Human error in their use is quite common.

Straps of wrist-mounts should be adjustable to suit ambidextrous wearing with a range of suits, and a single point strap failure should not result in loss of the instrument. Straps should be secure against sliding off the wrist in the event of suit compression when worn on the fore-arm.

Instrument consoles represent a concentrated source of information, and a large potential for operator error.

Head-up displays are sometimes used to alert the diver to changes that may require prompt response, usually related to gas concentrations in a rebreather loop.

Audible alarms and warnings are commonly provided on dive computers, often as user options. These generally alert the diver to ascent rate, decompression ceiling, and oxygen partial pressure violations, so they can be corrected promptly. They can also be used to inform the diver when the no-stop limit is reached, or for gas integrated units, when pressure is getting low.

Cutting tools

The primary function of diver cutting tools is to deal with entanglement by lines or nets. Preferably the tool should be accessible to both hands, and should be capable of cutting the diver free from any entanglement hazard predicted at the dive site. Many divers carry a cutting tool as standard equipment, and it may be required by code of practice as default procedure.

When entanglement risk is high, backup cutting tools may be required.

Dive lights

Dive lights may be needed to compensate for insufficient natural illumination or to restore colour. They may be carried in several ways depending on the purpose.

Head mount lights are used by divers who need to use both hands for other purposes. With a head mount there is a greater risk of dazzling other divers in the vicinity, as the lights move with the diver's head, and this arrangement is more appropriate for divers who work or explore alone. Helmet mounts are appropriate for illuminating work which is monitored via a helmet-mounted closed circuit video camera. A wide beam allows good illumination of the field of vision of diver and video camera.

Hand-held lights are directable by the diver independently of the direction the diver is facing and do not require any special mounting equipment, but occupy a hand, and are at risk of being dropped unless clipped on. They are most suitable for incidental lighting, and where precise direction is useful. Beam width and intensity preference depends on the application. High intensity, narrow beam lights are useful when the water is very clear, as they provide illumination at a greater distance for the same power output, which is useful for navigation and exploration. A wider beam may be more useful in low visibility and for work, where the diver needs to use a wider field of vision.

Glove or Goodman handle mount allows precise direction and other use of the hand, but not always both at the same time. Canister lights allow the light head to be held in optional ways, and the cable prevents the light from falling far if dropped, and can be looped over the neck to suspend the light to illuminate close-up work, but is an additional encumbrance. It is possible and fairly common to carry more than one of these options. Where light is important for safety, the diver will carry backup lights.

There are also special purpose light mounts, such as video and camera modelling lights, which must illuminate where the lens points, DPV headlights, internal and external bell lights, and ROV lights, which can be used to illuminate a work site to help the diver.

Buddy lines
 
A buddy line is a line or strap physically tethering two scuba divers together underwater to prevent separation and as a means of communication in low visibility conditions. It is usually a short length and may be buoyant to reduce the risk of snagging on the bottom. It does not need to be particularly strong or secure, but should not pull free under moderate loads, such as when used for line signals. Divers may communicate by rope signals, but may just use the line to attract attention before moving closer and communicating by hand signals. The disadvantage of a buddy line is an increased risk of snagging and entanglement, and the risk is increased with a longer or thinner line. Divers may need to disconnect the line quickly at either end in an emergency, which can be done via a quick-release mechanism or by cutting the line, both of which require at least one free hand. A velcro strap requires no tools for release and can be released under tension.

Clips and attachment points

Clips and attachment points should be reliable and must generally be operable by one hand with gloves suitable for the water temperature, without needing to see what is being done, as it may be dark, low visibility, or out of view. Single-hand operation is necessary where only one hand can reach, and is always preferable, as the other hand may be in use for something important at the time. While unlikely, it is possible for most types of clip to jam closed, and if this may endanger the diver it should be possible to use an alternative method to disconnect, which does not involve special tools. Cutting loose using the diver's cutting tool is the standard.

A reliable clip is one that does not allow connection to anything or disconnection by accident, but requires specific action by the operator to clip or unclip. Unreliable clips may cause loss of equipment or entanglement. Bolt snaps and screw-gate carabiners are examples of clips with a reputation for reliability. The carabiners are more secure, and may be load rated, but are less convenient to operate. Carabiners are approved for attaching the umbilical to a surface supplied diver's harness.

There are usually several attachment points provided on the diving harness or buoyancy compensator for securing accessories and additional diving cylinders. On technical harnesses these are often in the form of stainless steel D-rings or sliders with integral rings, and may be adjustable for position. Plastic D-rings are common on bulk-produced recreational buoyancy compensators, and are usually in fixed positions, held on by bar-tacked webbing straps or tabs, and are not replaceable. Professional harness is usually required to have at least one attachment point capable of lifting the diver out of the water. Attachment rings that are free to swing are less prone to snagging on the surroundings in tight spaces but are more difficult to clip onto one-handed when out of view.

Diver propulsion vehicles

 

A diver propulsion vehicle (DPV) is a power supply with integral thruster used by scuba divers to increase range underwater. Range is restricted by the amount of breathing gas that can be carried, the rate at which that breathing gas is consumed, and the power endurance and speed of the DPV. Time limits imposed on the diver by decompression requirements may also limit safe range in practice. DPVs have recreational, scientific and military applications. DPVs have been produced in a range of configurations from small, easily portable scooter units with a small range and low speed, to faired or enclosed units capable of carrying several divers longer distances at higher speeds. 

The most efficient position for towing behind is when the wake of the thruster bypasses the diver. This is usually achieved by using a tow leash from the DPV to a D-ring on the lower front of the diver's harness, and a handle on top of the DPV with a dead-man switch, to turn off the power of the DPV as soon as the diver lets go of the handle. The DPV is commonly steered by one hand, leaving the other hand free for other tasks. This requires good static and dynamic balance of both the DPV and the combination of diver and DPV, to avoid excessive diver fatigue. Lights, cameras, navigation, and other instruments may be mounted on a DPV for convenience, but the diver should carry backup for essential instruments in case the DPV must be abandoned in an emergency. Control of the DPV is additional task loading and can distract the diver from other matters. A DPV can increase the risk of a silt-out if the thrust is allowed to wash over the bottom.

DPV operation requires greater situational awareness than simply swimming, as some changes can happen much faster. Operating a DPV requires simultaneous depth control, buoyancy adjustment, monitoring of breathing gas, and navigation. Buoyancy control is vital for diver safety: The DPV has the capacity to dynamically compensate for poor buoyancy control by thrust vectoring while moving, but on stopping the diver may turn out to be dangerously positively or negatively buoyant if adjustments were not made to suit the changes in depth while moving.  If the diver does not control the DPV properly, a rapid ascent or descent under power can result in barotrauma or decompression sickness.

Cameras

 

 
Underwater cameras are usually popular models encased in a watertight pressure housing, though there have been a few notable exceptions, such as the Nikonos and Sea & Sea ranges, in which the camera body was the pressure housing. Controls are generally operated by movable links penetrating the watertight case, each requiring reliable seals, and each a potential leak. Compact and lightweight camera bodies with multiple controls packed into a small space tend to transform into bulky, heavy and expensive units when housed for moderately deep diving. Controls must be operable using thick gloves in cold water. Lighting varies depending on conditions, subject, lens, and other variables, and the use of modelling lights and external flash is common. These are usually supported by a camera tray and arms which allow the lightning to be aimed. This can make a camera setup very bulky and it may require most of the diver's attention. At the other extreme, a head-mounted sports video recorder may be triggered at the start of the dive and thereafter ignored until it is time to stop recording.

For most underwater photography, a camera that is close to neutral buoyancy will be easier to handle and have less disruptive effect on diver trim. Strobe arms incorporating incompressible buoyancy compartments are the preferred system, as they do not need to be adjusted for changes of depth.

Several manufacturers produce compact cameras that are inherently water-resistant to about 10 to 15 msw, and underwater housings rated to around 40 to 50 msw, which are small enough to fit into a large pocket, have a fairly large zoom range, and a large preview screen. Automatic focusing allows divers with imperfect vision to take acceptable photographs, and a minor housing leak is more an annoyance than a catastrophe, as the camera's own water resistance is a second line of defence. A large rear LCD screen viewfinder allows easy framing when automatic focusing is used. As the focus window usually changes colour when the autofocus is successful, the photographer can concentrate on framing and press the shutter release all the way when the focus icon turns green.

Internal flash is problematic at anything except very close range, as it can cause backscatter in turbid water, and is the major consumer of battery power at full power. External flash using optical coupling avoids hull penetrations and associated potential leaks, and video lights give a good preview of exposure, and also provide the diver with a high-power dive light, which is pointing in the right direction to record the scene most of the time. With the more powerful video lights and low-light sensitive cameras, flash may not be necessary, or fill-in flash use may extend the battery life to a few hundred photos.

A problem with underwater photography is inadvertent changing of camera settings, which may go unnoticed by the diver.

The controls and operation of underwater cameras differ considerably, even between models by the same manufacturer, but as they do not affect diver safety, no training is required, and the diver is free to learn by their own experience, or find someone to provide informal type training.

Surface marker buoys

A surface marker buoy that is towed for the whole dive to indicate the position of the diver throughout the dive should have sufficient buoyancy to reliably remain at the surface so it can be seen, and if it is to be actively towed, should not develop so much drag that the diver is unable to manage it effectively. The tow line may be a major source of drag, which is roughly proportional to its diameter, so a smaller, smooth line is preferable for low drag, and also fits on a more compact reel or spool. Smaller line may need to be of stronger and more abrasion resistant material like ultra-high-molecular-weight polyethylene for acceptable durability.

A decompression buoy deployed towards the end of the dive as a signal to the surface that the diver has started to ascend, is not usually towed, so drag is not usually a problem. visibility to a surface observer depends on colour, reflectivity, length above the water, and diameter. Volume also depends on length and diameter, and buoyancy depends on volume immersed. A low waterplane area has the advantage of reducing variation of line tension as waves pass overhead, making it easier to maintain accurate depth under large swells during decompression stops. A larger volume buoy is more visible at the surface but will pull upward harder if the reel jams during deployment.

Distance lines and line markers, reels and spools

Distance lines are used for underwater navigation where it is either essential to mark the route out of the overhead environment, or necessary or desirable to return to a specific point. Lines are deployed from reels or spools, and may be left in place or recovered on the return.

Line markers are generally used on permanent guidelines to provide critical information to divers following the line. The slots and notches provided are used to wrap the line to secure the marker in place. A simple passage of the line through the enlarged area at the base of the two slots will allow the marker to slide along the line, or even fall off if brushed by a diver. To more securely fasten the marker, an extra wrap may be added at each slot. It must be possible to fit, interpret and remove a line marker by feel in total darkness with the line under moderate tension without dislodging the line. The basic function of these markers is fairly consistent internationally, but procedures may differ by region, and between teams. The protocol for placement and removal should be well understood by the members of a specific team.

A dive reel comprises a spool to hold the line, with a winding knob, which rotates on an axle, attached to a frame, with a handle to hold the assembly in position while in use. A line guide is almost always present to prevent line from unwinding unintentionally, and there is usually a method of clipping the reel to the diver's harness when not in use. Reels may be made from a wide variety of materials, but near neutral buoyancy and resistance to impact damage are desirable features. Reels may also be open or closed. This refers to the presence of a cover around the spool, which is intended to reduce the risk of line tangles on the spool, or line flipping over the side and causing a jam. To some extent this works, but if there is a jam the cover effectively prevents the diver from correcting it. Open reels allow easy access to free jams caused by overwinds or line getting caught between spool and handle and allow visual checks on the line while winding it in. Reels should be easy to use and lockable to prevent unintentionally unrolling, and have sufficient friction to prevent overruns. Reels used for deploying DSMBs usually have a thumb release ratchet to prevent unwinding when there is tension on the line. A reel with a closed handle is less tiring to hold for long periods, particularly when wearing thick or stiff gloves.

Finger spools are a simple, compact low tech alternative to reels best suited to relatively short lengths of line. They are simply a pair of circular flanges with a hole in the middle, connected by a tubular hub, which is suitably sized to use a finger as an axle when unrolling the line. Line is secured by clipping a bolt snap through a hole on one of the flanges and over the line as it leaves the reel. Line is reeled in by holding the spool with one hand and simply winding the line onto the spool by hand. Spools are most suitable for reasonably short lines, up to about 50 m, as it becomes tedious to roll up longer lengths. The small, compact size, and low cost make them useful for various purposes where long line is not required. The double end bolt snap for locking the line may also be used as an aid for winding it in, to avoid line abrasion of the fingers or gloves.

Diving chambers

Design and construction of pressure vessels for human occupancy are regulated by law, safety standards, and codes of practice. These specify safety and ergonomic requirements, Lock opening sizes, internal dimensions, valve types and arrangement, safety interlocks, pressure gauge types and arrangements, gas inlet silencers, outlet safety covers, seating, illumination, breathing gas supply and monitoring, climate control and communications systems are covered, as well as structural strength, permitted materials, over-pressure relief, testing, fire suppression and periodical inspection.

Closed bell design must allow for access by divers wearing bulky diving suits and bailout sets appropriate for the depth. The amount of gas in the bailout set is calculated for a return rate of 10 metres per minute from the reach of the excursion umbilical, At greater depths this may require twin sets of high pressure cylinders. It must also be possible for the bellman to hoist an unconscious diver through the lock. A flood-up valve may be provided to allow partial flooding of the bell, so that an unresponsive diver is partially supported by buoyancy while being maneuvered through the opening. Once suspended inside the bell, the water can be blown back down by adding gas. The internal volume must include enough space for divers and equipment including racks for the excursion umbilicals and the bell gas panel. On-board gas cylinders, emergency power packs, tools and hydraulic power supply lines do not have to be stored inside. Access while underwater is through a lock at the bottom, so that the internal gas pressure can keep the water out. This lock can be used for transfer to the saturation habitat, or a side lock can be provided, which does not need to allow passage with harness and bailout cylinders as these are not carried into the habitat area and are serviced at atmospheric pressure.

The splash zone is the region where the bell passes through the surface of the water and where wave action and platform movement can cause the bell to swing around, which can be uncomfortable and dangerous to the occupants. To limit this motion a bell cursor may be used. A bell cursor is a device used to guide and control the motion of the bell through the air and the splash zone near the surface, where waves can move the bell significantly. It can either be a passive system that relies on additional ballast weight or an active system that uses a controlled drive system to provide vertical motion. The cursor has a cradle which locks onto the bell and which moves vertically on rails to constrain lateral movement. The bell is released and locked onto the cursor in the relatively still water below the splash zone.

A bell stage is a rigid frame that may be fitted below a closed bell to ensure that even if the bell is lowered so far as to contact the clump weight or the seabed, there is enough space under the bell for the divers to get in and out through the bottom lock. If all the lifting arrangements fail, the divers must be able to shelter inside the bell while awaiting rescue, and must be able to get out if the rescue is to another bell.

Each compartment of a hyperbaric system for human occupation has an independent separate externally mounted pressure gauge so that it is not possible to confuse which compartment pressure is being displayed. Where physically practicable, lock doors open towards the side where pressure is normally higher, so that a higher internal pressure will hold them closed and sealed.

Medical and supply lock outer doors generally open outwards due to space constraints, and therefore are fitted with safety interlock systems which prevent them from being opened with internal pressure above atmospheric to avoid the possibility of human error allowing them to be opened while the inner lock is not sealed, as the uncontrolled decompression that would ensue would probably kill the occupants, and possibly also the lock operator.

Internal diameter of hyperbaric living compartments and deck decompression chambers is constrained by codes of practice for reasonable comfort for the occupants. For emergency transfer chambers, there may be overriding logistical constraints on size and mass.

Hyperbaric stretchers 

A hyperbaric stretcher is a lightweight pressure vessel for human occupancy (PVHO) designed to accommodate one person undergoing initial hyperbaric treatment during or while awaiting transport or transfer to a treatment chamber.

The stretcher should accommodate most divers without being excessively claustrophobic, and be conveniently portable by a reasonable number of bearers, should fit into the available space in the transport likely to be used, fit through the entry opening of the treatment chamber, or lock onto the chamber for transfer under pressure. It should be possible to see and communicate with the person in the chamber, and the occupant should be able to breathe oxygen which is vented to the exterior to keep a constant internal pressure and limit the fire hazard. Breathing gas supplies should also be portable, and it should be possible to disconnect them for a short period when maneuvering in tight spaces.

Hyperbaric rescue and escape systems
 
A saturated diver who needs to be evacuated should preferably be transported without a significant change in ambient pressure. Hyperbaric evacuation requires pressurised transportation equipment, and could be required in a range of situations. The pressure rating and locking mechanism of the evacuation chamber must be compatible with the saturation system it is to serve, and the reception facility, as both transfers must be under pressure, and it may not be safe to start decompression during the evacuation.

Equipment storage on dive boats and dive preparation areas 

While it is possible for a diver to put on and take off some items of equipment in the water, there is a greater risk of fitting them incorrectly or losing them, particularly when the water is a bit rough. Doing this in the surf is even more risky, and delays at the surface on a boat dive can let the divers drift off site. When possible, kit-up and pre-dive checks should be completed on shore or on the boat, and the kit-up area should facilitate this, or at least make it possible. For recreational diving charter boats, this gives preference to arrangements where each diver can safely and securely stow all their personal dive gear at the same place where they will be putting it on, and where it is not necessary for it to be handled by anyone else except at the diver's request, as unauthorised handling of another person's life-support equipment could have legal consequences if something goes wrong.

Boarding the boat after a dive may require equipment to be removed, and this presents another set of hazards, and the associated risks of injury and damage to or loss of equipment, some of which may be avoided if the diver does not have to take off equipment in the water, and heavy equipment does not have to be lifted over the side of the boat with fragile dangling components exposed to snagging, impact, and crushing hazards. The requirement to remove fins before climbing some ladders reduces the diver's ability to swim back to the boat if they drift away. When boarding an anchored boat, some way of keeping within reach of the boarding area while removing equipment is required, and it may be necessary to use both hands to ensure secure removal and hand-over of some equipment.

Access equipment 
This includes the equipment needed to get into and out of the water. In most cases, this refers to diving from a floating platform, but also applies to shore dives where access requires equipment.

Diving stages and wet bells

Diving stages and wet bells are open platforms used to lower the divers to the work site and to control the ascent and in-water decompression, and to provide safe and easy entry and exit from the water. Design must provide space for the working diver and where appropriate, the bellman, in positions where they are protected from impact during transit and prevented from falling out when above the water. The divers may be seated, but more usually stand during transit.

A stage must have a way to guide the umbilical from the surface tending point to the diver so the diver can be sure of finding the right way back to the stage. This can be provided by having the diver exit the stage on the opposite side to boarding, with the umbilical passing through the frame, but this is not infallible in bad visibility, and a closed fairlead is more reliable. Running the umbilical via the stage may also be needed to ensure the diver cannot approach known hazards, such as the thrusters of a dynamically positioned vessel.

A wet bell has an open-bottomed air space at the top, large enough for the diver and bellman's heads, intended as a place of refuge in an emergency, where some breathing problems can be managed. The air space must be large enough for an unresponsive diver to be suspended by their harness with their head in the air space, as it may be necessary to remove an unresponsive diver's helmet or full-face mask to provide first aid. The bell is also provided with an on-board emergency gas supply, sufficient for any planned or reasonably foreseeable decompression, and a means of safely switching between surface and on-board gas supply. This necessitates an on-board gas distribution manifold and divers' umbilicals that are deployed from and stored on the bell, and someone to operate the panel and tend the working diver's excursion umbilical. The bellman does this, and also serves as standby diver. The buoyancy of the air space may have to be compensated by ballast, as the bell must be negatively buoyant during normal operation.

Diver ladders

For some applications, dive boat ladders that allow the diver to ascend without removing the fins are preferred. When there is a lot of relative motion between the diver and ladder, it can become difficult to safely remove fins, then get onto the ladder, and not lose the fins. A ladder that can be climbed with fins on the feet avoids this problem. A ladder that slopes at an angle of about 15° from the vertical reduces the load on the arms.

If a ladder is to be climbed in full equipment, suitable handholds to brace the diver while climbing the upper rungs and moving onto the deck to the place where gear will be removed are necessary for safety. This also applies if the divers need to climb down a ladder wearing dive gear, and they may need to turn round at the top of the ladder. In the general case, the vessel will be moving in a seaway while the diver is boarding.

Dive platforms and diver lifts 

A dive platform, or swim platform, is a near horizontal surface on a dive boat giving more convenient access to the water than the deck. It may be large enough for several divers to use simultaneously, or just enough for a single diver. The platform may be fixed, folding, or arranged to lower divers into the water and lift them out again, also known as a diver lift. Most dive platforms are mounted at the stern, usually on the transom, at a height a short distance above the waterline. They are easily flooded by a following sea, and are self-draining.

Fixed and folding platforms are generally provided with ladders which can be folded or lifted out of the water when not in use, and steps or ladders from the platform to the deck, while lifting platforms may be sufficiently immersible for the divers to swim directly over the platform and stand up to be lifted to a level where they can walk off onto the deck. Lifts are commonly mounted on the transom, or on the side of the boat. Handrails for use while using steps, ladders and lifts, when crossing or waiting on the platform, or making adjustments to equipment are a valuable safety adjunct as the platform will often be moving when in use, and the divers will usually be encumbered by heavy and bulky diving equipment. Barriers to protect occupants from pinch point hazards may be necessary when there are moving parts. The utility of a lift is enhanced if the diver can use it without having to remove any equipment in the water or on the platform, so an upper position level with the working deck and sufficient space to walk onto the deck fully kitted is preferable.

Fixed platforms giving easy access to the water are also sometimes provided at shore diving sites, such as flooded quarries used for diver training, or coastal jetties.

Recovery of an incapacitated diver 
Professional divers may be required to wear a harness suitable for lifting the diver out of the water in an emergency, and there will usually be an emergency recovery plan and the necessary extraction equipment and personnel available. Private recreational divers are not usually required to make any special provisions for an emergency, but recreational diving service providers may have a duty of care to their customers to provide for reasonably foreseeable emergencies with reasonably practicable facilities. There may be a regional or membership organisation standard or code of practice. Getting an incapacitated diver out of the water onto a boat or the shore for first aid would usually be considered an expected level of care. Recreational divers are not required to wear lifting grade harness, so other plans should be in place, and these often necessitate removing equipment from the diver, and the risk of losing the equipment. Details of methods to recover a diver into a boat will vary depending on the geometry of the boat. Simply dragging a diver over the pontoon of an inflatable hull may work in many cases. Larger boats with higher freeboard may have lifting gear that can be put to use with a rescue sling. A diver lift is capable of lifting a diver, but some arrangements must be made to keep the diver in a safe position on the lift while lifting.

Tools
Tools that are intended for use by divers should take into account the handicaps of the underwater environment on operator stability, mobility and control, within the full range of conditions in which they are likely to be used. Buoyancy effects on tool and operator, water movement, and reduced sensory input can complicate underwater tool use. Use with gloves is common, and can be a problem when controls are small and clustered.

Tool bags, pockets and lanyards

Lanyards and clipping points can prevent loss of tools and equipment like cameras, lights and cutting tools in mid-water or poor visibility, but can increase entanglement risk. Carrying heavy tools can compromise the diver's ability to accurately control ascent and descent rates, so it is common practice for professional divers to have their tools delivered in a bag lowered from the surface, or to transport them in a basket on the stage or bell which transports the diver to the underwater workplace. Tools do not have to be carried inside the pressurised volume of a closed bell, so the basket or rack can be on the bell stage or clump weight.

Pockets for small accessories are common on jacket-style buoyancy compensators. Wing buoyancy compensators generally do not have pockets, as the wing is behind the diver and the harness is usually fairly minimal, but pockets can be added to the waistbelt if there is space. They are supported by the webbing at the top and strapped around the thigh to prevent flapping. Pockets on the diving suit are more popular with technical divers, and may be glued to the front or side of the thighs of the suit, or attached in similar positions to wetsuit shorts or tunic worn over the main suit. Occasionally a chest pocket or internal key pocket may be provided. Sidemount divers may use a butt-pack, a clip-on bag worn behind the diver below the harness, and unclipped and brought forward for access. Position, size, shape, closures, and accessibility  are important for the function of carrying equipment, and possible interference with other equipment should also be considered.

Physiological variables

Task loading, nitrogen narcosis, fatigue, and cold can lead to loss of concentration and focus, reducing situation awareness. Reduced situation awareness can increase the risk of a situation that should be manageable developing into an incident where damage, injury or death may occur.

A diver must be able to survive any reasonably foreseeable single equipment failure long enough to reach a place where longer-term correction can be made. The solo diver can not rely on team redundancy, and must provide all the necessary emergency equipment indicated as necessary by the risk assessment, whereas a team can in many cases reduce risk to an acceptable level by distribution of redundancy among its members. However, the effectiveness of this strategy is tied to reliability of team cohesion and good communication.

No gender-specific traits have been identified which require design of tasks and tools exclusively for female divers. Fit of diving suits must be tailored to suit the range of human shapes and sizes, and most other equipment fits all sizes, is adjustable to suit all sizes, or is available in several sizes. A few items are designed specifically for female use, but this is often more a fine tuning for comfort or cosmetic styling than an ergonomically functional difference.

Female divers are reported, on average, to experience greater difficulty in performing five tasks of recreational diving: Carrying heavy equipment on shore, putting on the scuba set, underwater orientation, underwater balance and trim and descent. The first two are related to lifting large, heavy and bulky equipment. Balance and trim could be related to buoyancy and weight distribution, but insufficient data is available to specify a remedy. Buoyancy compensators and weighting systems may have been optimised for male buoyancy characteristics.

There is a relative growth in the older sector of recreational diver demographics. Some are newcomers to the activity and others are veterans continuing a long career of diving activity. They include older female divers. More research is needed to establish the implications of age and sex-related variations on human factors and safety issues.

Checklists

Checklists for preparation of the dive and diving equipment are regarded as important safety tools, and are mandatory in some circumstances. There are several design factors which affect the effectiveness of checklists.

See also

References

Diving equipment
Design
Ergonomics